This is a list of telephone area codes in the Commonwealth of Pennsylvania.

215: The city of Philadelphia and its immediately surrounding areas in the southeast corner of Pennsylvania directly to its north

223: Overlay plan with 717

267: Overlay plan with 215

272: Overlay plan with 570

412: The city of Pittsburgh and its immediately surrounding areas in Allegheny County

445: Overlay plan with 215 and 267

484: Overlay plan with 610

570: Northeastern Pennsylvania, including Scranton and Wilkes-Barre.

582: Overlay plan with 814

610: Southeastern Pennsylvania outside Philadelphia, including the Lehigh Valley, but excluding all but northernmost Bucks County and the eastern half of Montgomery County

717: South Central Pennsylvania, including Harrisburg, Lancaster, and York.

724: Western Pennsylvania outside Pittsburgh and Allegheny County (except for outermost areas, such as Wexford, Gibsonia, Tarentum, parts of Monroeville, and parts of southern AC); completely surrounds 412

814: Northwestern and central Pennsylvania, from Bedford County to Centre County extending to the shores of Lake Erie, and including the city of Erie

878: Overlay plan with 412 and 724.

The original four area codes for Pennsylvania in 1947 were 215, 412, 717, and 814.  610 was added in 1995, and several other splits and overlays have occurred since then. As a result, the entire state is composed of overlay regions and 10-digit dialing is mandatory statewide. Area Code 835 is planned as an additional overlay with 610.

External links

Area codes in Pennsylvania
Area code list
Pennsylvania